Léo Le Blé Jaques (born 2 January 1997) is a French professional snowboarder.

He won the bronze medal in the snowboard cross event at the FIS Freestyle Ski and Snowboarding World Championships 2021.

References

External links

1997 births
Living people
French male snowboarders
Sportspeople from the canton of Geneva
Universiade medalists in snowboarding
Universiade gold medalists for France
Competitors at the 2017 Winter Universiade
Snowboarders at the 2022 Winter Olympics
Olympic snowboarders of France
21st-century French people